Saïd Chibane (2 April 1925 – 4 December 2022) was an Algerian doctor and politician. A member of the Association of Algerian Muslim Ulema, he served as Minister of Religious Affairs Endowments from 1989 to 1991.

Chibane died on 4 December 2022, at the age of 97.

References

1925 births
2022 deaths
Algerian politicians
Government ministers of Algeria
University of Strasbourg alumni
People from Bouïra Province